William Francis Mack (February 12, 1885 – September 30, 1971) was a pitcher in Major League Baseball. He played for the Chicago Cubs in July 1908.  He was the last surviving player to have played for the 1908 Chicago Cubs, their most recent World Series championship until 2016.

External links

1885 births
1971 deaths
Major League Baseball pitchers
Chicago Cubs players
Baseball players from New York (state)
Syracuse Orangemen baseball players
Addison-Wellsville Tobacco Strippers players
Addison White Sox players